Massimo Rastelli (born 27 December 1968) is an Italian football manager and former player who played as a striker. He is the current head coach of  club Avellino.

Career

Playing
A second striker/winger, Rastelli started his career with Serie D club Solofra, and played professionally for the first time in 1988 with Catanzaro. After a long stint with Lucchese (seven consecutive Serie B season), he made his Serie A debut in 1997 with Piacenza, playing four years for the Emilians. In 2001, he joined then-Serie B club Napoli, failing to win promotion to the top flight with the fallen giants. He then signed for Reggina in 2002, in what it was his final Serie A season as a player. He retired in 2009 after a season with Juve Stabia.

Coaching
He was coach of Juve Stabia in the 2009–10 season, winning promotion to the Lega Pro Prima Divisione on his first attempt. He then signed for Brindisi the following season.

In the 2011–12 season he was the head coach of Portogruaro in Lega Pro Prima Divisione.

In the 2012–13 season he was the head coach of Avellino in Lega Pro Prima Divisione. The club won promotion to Serie B.

On 12 June 2015 Rastelli was hired by newly relegated club Cagliari for their 2015–16 Serie B season. He led Cagliari to win the Serie B title, and was consequently confirmed also for the 2016–17 Serie A campaign. He was sacked on 17 October 2017.

On 5 November 2018, Rastelli returned into management as the new head coach of Serie B club Cremonese. On 8 October 2019, he was fired by Cremonese with the team in 12th position in the table. On 8 January 2020, he was reinstated as head coach of Cremonese. He was dismissed as Cremonese boss for a second time on 4 March 2020, with the club languishing in the relegation zone.

On 16 March 2021, he was hired by Serie B club SPAL until the end of the 2020–21 season, with an option to extend the contract for another season. He left the club at the end of the season.

On 31 August 2021 he was named new head coach of Serie B club Pordenone. He was however dismissed himself on 16 October 2021, with Pordenone lying at the bottom of the league table, as he failed to turn the club's fortunes.

On 20 October 2022, Rastelli returned to Avellino, signing a two-year contract with the Serie C club, with a further two-year extension in case of promotion to Serie B.

Managerial statistics

Honours

Player
 Sorrento
 Serie C2: 2006–07
 Supercoppa di Lega Serie C2: 2007

Manager
 Avellino
 Lega Pro Prima Divisione: 2012–13
 Supercoppa di Lega di Prima Divisione: 2013
 Cagliari
 Serie B: 2015–16
 Juve Stabia
 Lega Pro Seconda Divisione: 2009–10

References

1968 births
Living people
People from Torre del Greco
Italian footballers
Association football forwards
Serie A players
Serie B players
Serie C players
S.S.D. Lucchese 1905 players
U.S. Catanzaro 1929 players
Mantova 1911 players
Piacenza Calcio 1919 players
S.S. Juve Stabia players
S.S.C. Napoli players
Reggina 1914 players
Como 1907 players
A.S.D. Sorrento players
U.S. Avellino 1912 players
S.S. Juve Stabia managers
U.S. Avellino 1912 managers
Serie A managers
U.S. Cremonese managers
S.P.A.L. managers
Pordenone Calcio managers
Serie B managers
Italian football managers
Sportspeople from the Province of Naples
Footballers from Campania